Roger Rabbit's Car Toon Spin is a dark ride located at the Disneyland and Tokyo Disneyland theme parks, based on the 1988 Disney/Amblin film Who Framed Roger Rabbit. Both versions of the attraction are located in Mickey's Toontown. The Disneyland version opened on January 26, 1994, a year after the Mickey's Toontown area opened, and the Tokyo Disneyland version opened on April 15, 1996. In December 2021, the Disneyland version was updated to include a new plot element of Jessica Rabbit in the role of a detective who is determined to stop a crime wave in Toontown.

History 
Roger Rabbit was recognized as a lucrative character by Disney after the release of Who Framed Roger Rabbit and a set of attractions based on the movie were developed for many Disney theme parks. Roger was set to be the star of his own land, behind Main Street, U.S.A. at Disneyland, called Hollywoodland. Meanwhile, over at the Magic Kingdom, a new land behind Fantasyland was being developed in honor of Mickey Mouse's sixtieth birthday, named Mickey's Birthdayland.

There were also set to be attractions based on Roger Rabbit, Judge Doom and Baby Herman opening in a major expansion at Disney's Hollywood Studios and Tokyo Disneyland, but after the financial troubles of the Euro Disney Resort, plans were cut back with only Disneyland and Tokyo Disneyland receiving any Roger Rabbit-themed attractions.

Imagineer Joe Lanzisero described the creation of the ride: 

In September 2021, it was announced that Walt Disney Imagineering would update the ride in Disneyland to include a new plot element of Jessica Rabbit in the role of a detective who is determined to stop a crime wave in Toontown. The update debuted in December 2021.

Queue and Ride

At the start of the ride's queue entering the Toontown Cab Company, some license plates hanging on the wall have code-like puns of various Disney characters or slogans. They include 2N TOWN (Toontown), BB WOLF (Big Bad Wolf), MR TOAD (Mr. Toad), 1DRLND (Wonderland), 1D N PTR (Wendy & Peter), IM L8 ("I'm late" - The White Rabbit), CAP 10 HK (Captain Hook), L MERM8 (Little Mermaid), 101 DLMN (101 Dalmatians), FAN T C (Fantasy), RS2CAT (Aristocat), ZPD2DA (Zip-a-Dee-Doo-Dah), and 3 LIL PIGS (Three Little Pigs). 

The queue winds its way through darkened Toontown streets and alleys, passing through the Ink and Paint Club's backstage areas including Jessica Rabbit's dressing room and the prop cage. (In the U.S. version, guests then pass by a newspaper article stating that Jessica Rabbit, inspired by her friend Eddie Valiant, has become a Toontown private eye who is determined to stop the weasels' recent crime wave.) Guests then past the window of Baby Herman's apartment. In a window on the upper floors, the shadows of the weasels' can be seen plotting to Dip the city with the queue passing above their Dip refinery. Exiting this area, the guests return to the Toontown Cab Company and approach the loading area. Characters' voices can also be heard throughout the queue, including two points where the weasels can be heard discussing their plans, one in the alley in front of the Ink and Paint Club and the other in their hideout. Jessica can also be heard talking on the phone and to her stage manager in her dressing room.

Guests board a yellow Toon cab named Lenny the Cab, the twin cousin of Benny the Cab. Each cab seats two people, and the cabs are dispatched in groups of two. Once the traffic light in the loading area changes to green, the cabs leave the loading area. The ride begins with Stupid, Greasy and Wheezy dumping barrels of Dip into the streets, sending Roger Rabbit and Benny spinning out of control, and the guests' cab drives into the Dip as well. At this point, the steering wheel of the cab becomes active, and the cab can then spin around, much like Mad Tea Party in Fantasyland. Nearby, Smart Guy has tied up Jessica and placed her in the trunk of his car. (in U.S. version, there are barrels of Dip in the trunk of Smart Guy's car that he is dumping onto the street. Jessica is dressed in a detective's trench coat and fedora, standing behind Smart Guy with her arm held forward, directing the weasels to stop dumping Dip).   

The cabs then crash through the Bullina China Shoppe run by a bull, who is trying to protect some of his stock. Upon exiting the shop, the cars travel down Spin Street, where Toon fire hydrants, telephone poles, mailboxes, and streetlights laugh and dance around.

Next, the cabs enter the Toontown Power House, where they pass a furnace with an abstract face and encounter Roger having an electricity fight with Psycho. Passing through a series of explosions, the cabs "fall down" from Toon skyscrapers. Heading closer to street level past a group of stairs, Roger promises to fix things.

The cabs then enter the Gag Factory, going past various jokes and gags, and a weasel named Sleazy holds a large metal gate open for the cabs. Jessica manages to free herself and assaults Greasy and Wheezy with a mallet. (In the U.S. version, Jessica assaults Greasy and Wheezy using a mallet from her "anti-weasel equipment" bag). Stupid then tries to drop a safe onto the cabs. Just as the Dip Machine (operated by Smart Guy) is about to Dip the cabs, they narrowly escape and Roger saves the guests by stretching his arm out and using a portable hole to allow the cabs to return safely to the Toontown Cab Company, going through a cartoon "The End" title card to return to the loading area.

Voice cast
Jess Harnell as Roger Rabbit
 Marnie Mosiman as Jessica Rabbit
Jim Cummings as Baby Herman
Charles Fleischer as Benny the Cab, Lenny the Cab, Greasy and Psycho
David Lander as Smart Guy
June Foray as Wheezy
Fred Newman as Stupid
Will Ryan as Sleazy
Marcelo Vignali as Bongo, Bull and Jack-in-the-Box Clown M
Joe Lanzisero as Jack-in-the-Box Clown J
Tony Anselmo as Donald Duck
Brad Abrell as Safety Spiel Announcer

Incident

On September 22, 2000, a four-year-old boy fell out of the Disneyland version of the ride and suffered serious injuries. The victim's family sued and eventually settled out of court. In January 2009, the boy died at the age of 13 due to complications from his injuries.

See also 
List of Disneyland attractions

References 
 https://insidethemagic.net/2021/09/disneyland-jessica-rabbit-fans-react-kc1/

External links 
 Disneyland - Roger Rabbit's Car Toon Spin
Tokyo Disneyland - Roger Rabbit's Car Toon Spin
 AllEarsNet - Roger Rabbit's Car Toon Spin
 Laughing Place - Roger Rabbit's Car Toon Spin

Amusement rides introduced in 1994
Amusement rides introduced in 1996
Walt Disney Parks and Resorts attractions
Disneyland
Tokyo Disneyland
Dark rides
Who Framed Roger Rabbit
Fictional companies
Mickey's Toontown
Audio-Animatronic attractions
Amusement rides based on film franchises
1994 establishments in California
1996 establishments in Japan